The 1981 World Games were the first World Games and were held in Santa Clara, California in the United States. The games featured sports that were not included in the Olympics.India competed at the 1981 World Games in Santa Clara and won one Bronze medal in Badminton Men's Singles.

Medalists

References

1981
1981 in Indian sport
1981 World Games